Tresillo (capital: Ꜫ, small: ꜫ; Spanish for "little three") is a letter of several colonial Mayan alphabets in the Latin script that is based on the digit 3. It was invented by a Franciscan friar, Francisco de la Parra, in the 16th century to represent the uvular ejective consonant  found in Mayan languages, and is known as one of the Parra letters. In cursive form, the tresillo is often written .

As an example of use, the word for fire in the Kaqchikel language, is written  in the Parra orthography.

See also
Cuatrillo

References

External links
Cuatrillo and Tresillo in Recent Linguistic Publications

3 Tresillo
Mayan languages